Alfed Zulkowski (August 12, 1940 – October 19, 1989) was a German footballer.

The goalkeeper made a single appearance in the East Germany national team in 1962 match against Guinea.

In the East German top-flight he became the first-choice goalie of Vorwärts Berlin in the late 1960s.

References

External links
 
 
 

1940 births
1989 deaths
German footballers
East German footballers
East Germany international footballers
1. FC Frankfurt players
Association football goalkeepers
People from Wismar
Footballers from Mecklenburg-Western Pomerania